Isaac Erter (1792 – April 1851) was a Polish-Jewish satirist and poet of the Galician Haskalah. His Hebrew prose has been compared to that of writers Heinrich Heine and Ludwig Börne.

Biography
Isaac Erter was born into the family of a poor Jewish innkeeper in the Galician town of Koniuszek, near Przemyśl. At the age of 13, his father arranged for him to marry a rabbi's daughter, who, however, died within the first year after her marriage. A second marriage followed soon after, and Erter went to live with his father-in-law in  Wielkie Oczy. There he was introduced to Jewish philosophy and Hebrew literature by maskil Yosef Tarler.

Erter began associating with the Ḥasidic movement, but after a time abandoned it and settled in Lemberg in 1813. In that city he joined the maskilic circles of Solomon Löb Rapoport, Nachman Krochmal, Judah Löb Mieses, and others. Through the efforts of some of his friends, he obtained pupils whom he instructed in Hebrew language and other subjects. This comparatively happy state ended after three years, when, on 10 May 1816, Chief Rabbi Jacob Meshullam Ornstein excommunicated the city's most prominent maskilim. Deprived thus of his pupils, the only means of his subsistence, he settled in the neighbouring town of Brody, where he encountered , Jacob Bick, and Isaac Baer Levinsohn. When in 1823 a new Jewish school was inaugurated there, he was entrusted with its management.

After a short time, he resigned his position, and made up his mind to prepare himself for a career in medicine. Erter studied at the University of Budapest from 1825 to 1829, and passed all the prescribed examinations. He afterwards practised his new profession in various Galician towns amid the cholera pandemic, eventually returning to Brody, where he made himself especially popular among the poor and needy. In public affairs, Erter founded the Galizisch-jüdischer Akerbauverein, which advocated for the establishment in Galicia of agricultural colonies for the employment and benefit of young Jews.

The last years of his life were again visited by various hard trials, chiefly caused by the untimely death of his two married daughters. He did not survive them long, and died during the Passover of 1851.

Work
Erter devoted his leisure time to the composition of essays and satires on Jewish subjects, which were published from 1823 until his death. These he usually sent to his literary friends, to be read and criticised, before allowing them to be printed in the Hebrew periodicals.

His collected works were published posthumously under the title Ha-tzofeh le-veit Yisrael ('A Watchman unto the House of Israel'; Vienna, 1858), with a biography of the author and introduction by Max Letteris. The book includes the stories Mozne mishkal ('Weighing Scale', 1823), Ha-tzofeh be-shubo mi-Karlsbad ('The Watchman on His Return from Carlsbad'), Gilgul ha-nefesh ('Transmigration of the Soul, 1845), Tashlikh (1840), Telunat Sani ve-Sansani ve-Samangaluf ('The Complaints of Sani and Sansani and Samangaluf', 1837), and Ḥasidut ve-ḥokmah ('Piety and Wisdom', 1834).

His most popular satire is Gilgul ha-nefesh, the humorous story of the many adventures of a soul during a long earthly career; how it frequently passed from one body into another, and how it had once left the body of an ass for that of a physician. The soul gives the author the following six rules, by observing which he might succeed in his profession:

The story was later translated into Yiddish by Isaac Mayer Dick.

Erter was involved in the founding of the Hebrew periodical He-Ḥalutz, which was intended chiefly to develop the Hebrew language, and to promote culture and enlightenment among the Galician Jews. He died one year before the first volume appeared. He also wrote some Hebrew verse; but this won little acclaim compared to his prose.

References

External links
 
 

1792 births
1851 deaths
19th-century Austrian Jews
19th-century Austrian physicians
19th-century Polish Jews
19th-century Polish physicians
Austrian Empire Jews
Austrian satirists
Hebrew-language poets
Hebrew-language writers
Jewish physicians
Jews from Galicia (Eastern Europe)
People from Brody
People from Przemyśl County
People of the Haskalah
Polish satirists
Polish male writers
Ukrainian Jews
Budapest University alumni